Kheshti (also Romanized as Kheshtī; also known as Khishti) is a village in Alamarvdasht Rural District, Alamarvdasht District, Lamerd County, Fars Province, Iran. At the 2006 census, its population was 177, in 34 families.

References 

Populated places in Lamerd County